Willie Dove (born December 22, 1945) is an American politician who served as a member of the Kansas House of Representatives from 2013 to 2021. He was elected in 2012. Previously, he was an unsuccessful candidate for the House of Representatives in 2004 and for the Kansas Board of Education in 2010. Dove is a Republican. He is African-American.

References

African-American state legislators in Kansas
Republican Party members of the Kansas House of Representatives
Living people
21st-century American politicians
1945 births
21st-century African-American politicians
20th-century African-American people